Bakharz County is in Razavi Khorasan province, Iran. The capital of the county is the city of Bakharz. At the 2006 census, the region's population (as Bakharz District of Taybad County) was 40,076 in 9,024 households. The following census in 2011 counted 53,582 people in 14,021 households, by which time the district had been separated from the county to form Bakharz County. At the 2016 census, the county's population was 54,615 in 15,525 households.

Administrative divisions 

The population history and structural changes of Bakharz County's administrative divisions over three consecutive censuses are shown in the following table. The latest census shows two districts, four rural districts, and one city.

References 

 

Counties of Razavi Khorasan Province